Retrospectable is a greatest hits album by the Australian rock band Bluejuice, released through Dew Process in September 2014. The album was announced on Triple J on 4 August 2014 inconjuction with their retirement and farewell tour. Retrospectable peaked at number 27 on the ARIA Charts.

Reception
James Tait from Scenewave Australia said "Retrospectable is their anthological swansong to sail off into the sunset in a yellow leotard with. It's a collection of previous singles including festival anthem 'Broken Leg' as well as the song that first brought them screaming and spitting onto the national stage; the twitchy, scuzzy, shouty, fantastic 'Vitriol'. There is an even enough split of well known material here from each of the Sydney boys' previous three albums to keep this one in high rotation in the car stereos of all of their fans as well as three new tracks that represent what a diverse and genre-bending musical act Bluejuice really became."

Track listing

Charts

Release history

References

2014 greatest hits albums
Compilation albums by Australian artists
Bluejuice albums